The S2 6.8 is an American trailerable sailboat that was designed by Don Wennersten and Arthur Edmunds as a racer-cruiser and first built in 1976. The designation indicates the approximate length overall in meters.

With an optional red and orange hull and sail stripe trim package, the boat was sold as the S2 6.8 Exciter.

Production
The design was built by S2 Yachts in Holland, Michigan, United States from 1978 until 1978, with 150 boats completed, but it is now out of production.

Design
The S2 6.8 is a recreational keelboat, built predominantly of fiberglass, with wood trim. It has a masthead sloop rig, a raked stem, an angled transom, a transom-hung rudder controlled by a tiller and a fixed shoal draft keel with an optional cast iron centerboard. It displaces  and carries  of lead ballast.

The boat is normally fitted with a small  outboard motor for docking and maneuvering.

The design has sleeping accommodation for four people, with a double "V"-berth in the bow cabin and two straight settee berths in the main cabin. The galley is located on the port side at the companionway ladder. The galley is equipped with a sink. The head is located under the "V"-berth in the bow cabin on the port side.

Operational history
In a 2010 review Steve Henkel wrote, "Here is a 1970s-style flush-deck offering from S2 ... The S2 6.8 was offered with either a keel-centerboard arrangement ... or as a plain shoal-draft keel (same hull without the centerboard). Best features: the big, flat forward deck is ideal for sunbathing, assuming cure not short-tacking upwind with a 150% decksweeper jib. Her cockpit looks big and comfortable, with high coamings for good back support. Worst features: To our eyes she's not a pretty boat; we think the flush deck and lack of springy sheer give her a tubby look, With the lowest SA/D ratio, the highest D/L ratio, and the highest Motion Index among her comp[etitor]s, she is apt to be slower (note the relatively high PHRF rating) though more stable and comfortable in a seaway. With only one small forward hatch and no opening ports for ventilation, she wouldn't be a good choice for extended cruising in hot climates."

See also
List of sailing boat types

References

External links
Video - sailing an S2 6.8

Keelboats
1970s sailboat type designs
Sailing yachts
Trailer sailers
Sailboat type designs by Arthur Edmunds
Sailboat type designs by Don Wennersten
Sailboat types built by S2 Yachts